The 2012 OFC Under 17 tournament was the second edition of the OFC Women's Under 17 Qualifying Tournament, which acted as the 2012 FIFA U-17 Women's World Cup qualifier in the Oceania Football Confederation region. It took place from 9 to 14 April in Auckland, New Zealand. New Zealand were the defending champions after winning the 2010 edition.

New Zealand won the tournament undefeated with a goal difference of 29–1 and qualified to the World Cup.

The tournament was held alongside the 2012 OFC Women's Under 20 Qualifying Tournament, using the same venue and alternating matchdays.

Participating teams
 
 
  (hosts)

Matches
The four teams played a single round robin.

Top goalscorers
players with at least two goals:
6 goals

  Hannah Carlsen
  Jasmine Pereira

4 goals

  Martine Puketapu
  Emma Rolston

3 goals

  Tepaeru Toka
  Daisy Cleverley
  Briar Palmer

2 goals

  Georgina Kaikas
  Ramona Lorenz

Awards
New Zealand's Carlsen and Pereira were handed the golden boot for scoring six goals each. New Zealand also won the Fair Play awards as well as the Best Player award with Briar Palmer. Moeroa Nootai from Cook Islands received the Golden Gloves award for best goal-keeping.

References

External links 
 Competition at OFC website
 Championship at futbol24.com

2012 in women's association football
women
2012
2012
Under
2012 in youth association football